Epsiprantel (trade name Cestex) is a veterinary drug which is used as an anthelmintic against tapeworms such as Echinococcus granulosus.

Indications
It is indicated for the removal of cestodes (tapeworms) in cats (Dipylidium caninum and Taenia taeniaeformis) and dogs (Dipylidium caninum and Taenia pisiformis) 7 weeks of age and older.

References 

Anthelmintics
Veterinary drugs
Benzazepanes
Heterocyclic compounds with 3 rings
Cyclohexyl compounds